Cochlicella barbara, now known as Prietocella barbara, is a species of small but high-spired, air-breathing land snail, a pulmonate gastropod mollusk in the family Geomitridae.

Distribution

This species is native to Europe. It occurs, mostly on the coast, from north Portugal to the northwestern Mediterranean area. It has been widely introduced in other countries in the same general area, including England and Wales.

This is also an introduced species in Australia, and South Africa.

References

 Provoost, S.; Bonte, D. (Ed.) (2004). Animated dunes: a view of biodiversity at the Flemish coast [Levende duinen: een overzicht van de biodiversiteit aan de Vlaamse kust]. Mededelingen van het Instituut voor Natuurbehoud, 22. Instituut voor Natuurbehoud: Brussel, Belgium. . 416, ill., appendices pp.
 Barker, G. M. (1999). Naturalised terrestrial Stylommatophora (Mollusca: Gastropoda). Fauna of New Zealand 38: 1-254.
 Kerney, M.P., Cameron, R.A.D. & Jungbluth, J-H. (1983). Die Landschnecken Nord- und Mitteleuropas. Ein Bestimmungsbuch für Biologen und Naturfreunde, 384 pp., 24 plates.
 Spencer, H.G., Marshall, B.A. & Willan, R.C. (2009). Checklist of New Zealand living Mollusca. pp. 196–219. in: Gordon, D.P. (ed.) New Zealand inventory of biodiversity. Volume one. Kingdom Animalia: Radiata, Lophotrochozoa, Deuterostomia. Canterbury University Press, Christchurch.

External links
 Cochlicella barbara at AnimalBase
 Linnaeus, C. (1758). Systema Naturae per regna tria naturae, secundum classes, ordines, genera, species, cum characteribus, differentiis, synonymis, locis. Editio decima, reformata [10th revised edition], vol. 1: 824 pp. Laurentius Salvius
 Draparnaud, J.-P.-R. (1801). Tableau des mollusques terrestres et fluviatiles de la France. Montpellier / Paris (Renaud / Bossange, Masson & Besson). 1-116
 Férussac, A.E.J.P.F. d'Audebard de. (1821-1822). Tableaux systématiques des animaux mollusques classés en familles naturelles, dans lesquels on a établi la concordance de tous les systèmes; suivis d'un Prodrome général pour tous les mollusques ou fluviatiles, vivantes ou fossiles. Paris, 1821 et 1822. Livraison 9: 1-24 (Quarto edition) [Folio edition: 1-32] (6-IV-1821); livr. 10: 25-48 (Quarto) [Folio: 33-56] (26-V-1821); livr. 11: 49-72 (Quarto) [Folio: 57-76] (13-VII-1821); livr. 12: 73-88 (Quarto) [Folio: 77-92] (21-IX-1821); livr. 13: 89-110 (Quarto) [Folio: 93-114] (10-XI-1821); livr. 14: i-xxiv (Quarto) (16-II-1822); livr. 15: xxv-xlvii[i] (Quarto) (13-IV-1822); livr. 16: 1-27 (Quarto) (16-VII-1822). – Paris / London (Arthus Bertrand / G.B. Sowerby). 

Cochlicellidae
Gastropods described in 1758
Taxa named by Carl Linnaeus
Gastropods of Lord Howe Island